Kim Zin-hook (born 1 March 1940) is a North Korean speed skater. He competed in two events at the 1964 Winter Olympics.

References

1940 births
Living people
North Korean male speed skaters
Olympic speed skaters of North Korea
Speed skaters at the 1964 Winter Olympics
People from Hamhung